is a Japanese hurdler. He competed in the 400 metres hurdles event at the 2015 World Championships in Beijing without qualifying for the semifinals. Earlier that year he won the gold medal at the 2015 Asian Championships. His personal best in the 400 metres hurdles is 49.41 seconds set in Osaka in 2011.

Personal best

Competition record

References

External links

Yuta Konishi at Sumitomo Electric 

1990 births
Living people
Sportspeople from Osaka Prefecture
Japanese male hurdlers
World Athletics Championships athletes for Japan
Place of birth missing (living people)
21st-century Japanese people